Antispila iviella is a moth of the family Heliozelidae. It was described by Kuroko in 1961. It is found in Japan (Yakushima).

The wingspan is 5–6 mm. The forewings are dark bronzy-fuscous with brassy reflections, becoming purplish reflections towards the apex and termen. The basal area is shining dark leaden and the markings are rather raised and silvery-metallic tinged with faint golden. The hindwings are pale fuscous with feeble lusters. Adults appear in July.

The larvae feed on Parthenocissus tricuspidata. They mine the leaves of their host plant. The mine has the form of a full depth linear-blotch. The larva first makes a whitish-brown linear mine, which later becomes an irregular wavy gallery, sometimes in the form of a spiral at the beginning. After continuing to feed in this linear track for some distance, the mine develops rather abruptly into a pale brown irregular blotch. The frass is blackish brown and is deposited in a line along the center of the linear mine. In the blotch mine, it is scattered in a large pale brown patch in the middle of the mine. Larvae have been recorded at the end of October. Full-grown larvae cut out a case in which they hibernate.

References

Moths described in 1961
Heliozelidae
Moths of Japan